The Orosi River, also called Rio Grande de Orosi, is a river in Costa Rica near the Cordillera de Talamanca. It goes through the Tapantí National Park and drains into Lake Cachi (Lago de Cachi), the site of the Cachi Dam (Represa de Cachi).

Rivers of Costa Rica